Frank Donald Goodish (June 18, 1946 – July 17, 1988) was an American professional wrestler who earned his greatest fame under the ring name Bruiser Brody. He also worked as King Kong Brody, The Masked Marauder, and Red River Jack. Over the years Brody became synonymous with the hardcore wrestling brawling style that often saw one or more of the participants bleeding by the time the match was over. In his prime he worked as a "special attraction" wrestler in North America, making select appearances for various promotions such as World Class Championship Wrestling (WCCW), World Wide Wrestling Federation (WWWF), Central States Wrestling (CSW), Championship Wrestling from Florida (CWF), and the American Wrestling Association (AWA) among others. He worked regularly in Japan for All Japan Pro Wrestling (AJPW).

Behind the scenes Brody was very protective of his "in-ring" image, hardly ever agreeing to lose matches and building a reputation of being volatile; he would on occasion intentionally hit or hurt opponents during a match contrary to the pre-determined nature of professional wrestling. His in-ring work and wrestling persona earned him an induction in the professional wrestling hall of fame, St. Louis Wrestling Hall of Fame, Southern Wrestling Hall of Fame, Wrestling Observer Newsletter Hall of Fame and the WWE Hall of Fame.

Brody died in 1988 from stab wounds suffered backstage in a shower during a wrestling event in Puerto Rico. The killer was José González, better known as Invader I. A jury acquitted González of murder, ruling that González killed Brody in self-defense. Key witnesses to the killing did not give testimony at González' trial due to their summonses only being received after the trial had concluded.

Early life
Goodish was an All-State football and basketball player at Warren High School, Michigan, and played football at West Texas A&M University (then known as West Texas State) and with four teams over three seasons in the TFL and the COFL.

Professional wrestling career 
After attending West Texas A&M and working as a sportswriter Goodish was trained to wrestle by Fritz Von Erich. He first wrestled in Dallas - Fort Worth and later Louisiana. As Bruiser Brody and King Kong Brody (the latter, a name he used in Midwestern promotions out of respect for Dick the Bruiser), Goodish competed as a freelancer in several companies including the Central States Wrestling (CSW), World Wide Wrestling Federation (WWWF), Southwest Championship Wrestling (SCW), Windy City Wrestling, World Wrestling Council (WWC), Deep South Wrestling (DSW), Championship Wrestling from Florida (CWF), American Wrestling Association (AWA), and World Class Championship Wrestling (WCCW).  In the States, he had numerous feuds with the likes of Kamala the Ugandan Giant, Abdullah the Butcher, and "Crusher" Jerry Blackwell. In Japan, he was in a tag team with Stan Hansen. Brody had a reputation for refusing to job to other wrestlers. He also competed under the moniker of Red River Jack in Texas, during an angle against Gary Hart's men and Skandor Akbar's Army in World Class Championship Wrestling. Brody also competed as the Masked Marauder at one time in the AWA. In 1976, he went to Vince J. McMahon's WWWF where he challenged WWWF Champion Bruno Sammartino, but was unsuccessful in winning the championship. Brody also teamed with Big John Studd. It was also in the WWWF where he wrestled Invader 1 (José González), for whom he refused to sell.

In 1985, he had a very short stint with New Japan Pro-Wrestling (NJPW) in a feud with Antonio Inoki and many of their matches ended in no contests or disqualifications. In 1987, Brody began working primarily for the World Wrestling Council in Puerto Rico after getting fired from New Japan. Brody continued his feud with Abdullah the Butcher, as well as engaging in a feud with Carlos Colon. He briefly returned to All Japan Pro Wrestling to win his last NWA International Heavyweight Championship. On April 15, 1988, the first attempt to form what became the Triple Crown Heavyweight Championship was done when Brody faced off against NWA United National and PWF champion Genichiro Tenryu; the result was a double countout. Brody lost the title to Jumbo Tsuruta four days later. In WCCW in Texas he was actually a babyface, most often against Abdullah The Butcher. However against Abdullah in Montreal he was a heel managed by Floyd Creatchman. While there Tim "Killer" Brooks acted as his brother Buster Brody. Brody was in an ongoing feud with The Russian Brute who later went on to AWA fame with Manager Ox Baker. Due to his huge reputation in Japan promoter Shohei Baba had the match taped and later aired on Japanese TV.

In Florida he beat B. Brian Blair for the Florida State championship. Brody had an infamous cage match with Lex Luger in Florida on January 21, 1987. In the middle of the match, Brody stopped "working" and stood around. Luger and Bill Alfonso, the referee of the match, were puzzled and attempted to speak to Brody who did not respond. Luger and Alfonso decided to forgo the planned finish of the match and Alfonso disqualified Luger in a spot where Luger continually punched Brody in a corner and did not back off. After the match, Luger recalls asking Brody if he did anything wrong to upset him, to which Brody responded "no", and Brody's reasons for not working were not very clear, stating that "the match just wasn't working". In Larry Matysik's book, Wrestling at the Chase, Matysik states that before the match Brody told him "I'm not putting up with any of his bullshit" and that Brody was upset that Luger would not sell for him. However, when watching the match, it is clear that Luger did sell for Brody. In a later shoot interview, Bill Alfonso said that there was a miscommunication issue on who would lead the match and there was no ill will ever between the two. Another scenario was that Brody was upset with the promoters over his paychecks (Brody had a contentious history with wrestling promoters for much of his career) and decided to embarrass the promotion by being uncooperative in the match. In 1987 he returned to the AWA where he fought Greg Gagne and Jerry Blackwell. Despite his reputation as being disagreeable with promoters he would aid any who needed a boost in ticket sales as he was guaranteed to bring in crowds. While working for WCCW in Texas he was the booker and produced their TV program.

Personal life 
Prior to his wrestling career, Goodish worked as a sportswriter in San Antonio, Texas. Goodish was married on June 4, 1968, to Nola Marie Neece; the marriage ended in divorce on October 12, 1970. Goodish's second wife, New Zealander Barbara Smith, remained with him until his death in 1988. She has stated that while his wrestling persona was known for brutality and being uncontrollable, Brody was the complete opposite with his family. Brody and Smith lived in Texas. Together they had a son named Geoffrey Dean, born November 7, 1980.

Death 

On July 16, 1988, Brody was in the locker room before his scheduled match with Dan Spivey at Juan Ramón Loubriel Stadium in Bayamón (a city near San Juan, Puerto Rico), when José Huertas González, a fellow wrestler and booker, allegedly asked him to step into the shower area to discuss business. There was an argument between the two wrestlers and a scuffle ensued. Due to the dressing room layout, there were no witnesses to the altercation. However, two screams were heard, loud enough for the entire locker room to hear. Tony Atlas ran to the shower and saw Brody bent over and holding his stomach. Atlas then looked up at González and saw him holding a bloody knife.

Due to the heavy traffic outdoors and large crowd in the stadium it took paramedics almost an hour to reach Brody. When the paramedics arrived, Atlas helped carry Brody downstairs to the waiting ambulance as, due to Brody's size, paramedics were unable to lift him. He later died from his stab wounds. González claimed self-defense and testified in his own defense. He was acquitted of murder in 1989. The prosecution witnesses living outside of Puerto Rico did not show up, claiming they had not received their summons until after the trial had ended.

Fellow wrestlers Dutch Mantel and Tony Atlas have said that in the 1970s, when Brody and González had wrestled each other, Brody had wrestled very roughly and beat up González. S. D. Jones claims after one such match González said to him "one day I am gonna kill that man".

In April 2019, Brody's death was featured on VICE's Dark Side of the Ring - Season 1, Episode 3, which included interviews with Dutch Mantel, Tony Atlas and Abdullah the Butcher.

Championships and accomplishments 
 All Japan Pro Wrestling
NWA International Heavyweight Championship (3 times)
 PWF World Tag Team Championship (1 time) –  with Stan Hansen
 World's Strongest Tag Determination League (1981) – with Jimmy Snuka
 World's Strongest Tag Determination League (1983) – with Stan Hansen
 January 3 Korakuen Hall Heavyweight Battle Royal (1979)
 Champion Carnival Fighting Spirit Award (1981)
 World's Strongest Tag Determined League Exciting Award (1982) – with Stan Hansen
 Cauliflower Alley Club
 Posthumous Award (2015)
 Central States Wrestling
 NWA Central States Heavyweight Championship (1 time)
 NWA Central States Tag Team Championship (1 time) – with Ernie Ladd
 Championship Wrestling from Florida
 NWA Florida Heavyweight Championship (1 time)
George Tragos/Lou Thesz Professional Wrestling Hall of Fame
Frank Gotch Award (2018)
 National Wrestling Federation
 NWF International Championship (1 time)
 NWA Big Time Wrestling/World Class Wrestling Association
 NWA American Heavyweight Championship (4 times)
 NWA American Tag Team Championship (3 times) – with Kerry Von Erich
 NWA Brass Knuckles Championship (Texas version) (8 times)
 NWA Texas Heavyweight Championship (1 time)
 NWA Texas Tag Team Championship (3 times) – with Mike York (1), Gino Hernandez (1), and Kerry Von Erich (1)
 WCWA Television Championship (1 time)
 NWA Tri-State
 NWA United States Tag Team Championship (Tri-State version) (2 time) – with Stan Hansen
 Professional Wrestling Hall of Fame
 Class of 2014
 Pro Wrestling Illustrated
 Editor's Award (1988) tied with Adrian Adonis
 Ranked No. 14 of the 500 top wrestlers of the "PWI Years" in 2003
 Southwest Championship Wrestling
 SCW Southwest Brass Knuckles Championship (1 time)
 SCW World Tag Team Championship (1 time) – with Dick Slater
 St. Louis Wrestling Hall of Fame
 Class of 2007
 Southern Wrestling Hall of Fame
 Class of 2013
 Tokyo Sports
 Lifetime Achievement Award (1988)
 Western States Sports
 NWA Western States Heavyweight Championship (1 time)
 World Championship Wrestling (Australia)
 World Brass Knuckles Championship (1 time)
 World Wrestling Association
 WWA World Heavyweight Championship (1 time)
 WWE
WWE Hall of Fame (Class of 2019) Legacy Inductee
 Wrestling Observer Newsletter
 Best Brawler (1980–1984, 1987, 1988)
 Wrestling Observer Newsletter Hall of Fame (Class of 1996)

See also
 List of premature professional wrestling deaths
 "The Killing of Bruiser Brody"

References

External links 

 
 Mid-South Wrestling profile
 
 Frank Goodish on Pro Football Archives

1946 births
1988 deaths
20th-century American male actors
American male professional wrestlers
American sportswriters
Deaths by stabbing in Puerto Rico
Expatriate professional wrestlers in Japan
Professional wrestlers from Michigan
Professional Wrestling Hall of Fame and Museum
Sportspeople from Albuquerque, New Mexico
Sportspeople from Warren, Michigan
West Texas A&M Buffaloes football players
WWE Hall of Fame Legacy inductees
20th-century professional wrestlers
NWA Florida Heavyweight Champions
WCWA Brass Knuckles Champions
NWA International Heavyweight Champions
World Brass Knuckles Champions
PWF World Tag Team Champions